Ilona Ruotsalainen (born 8 January 1981) is a Finnish snowboarder. 

She was born in Jyväskylä. She competed at the 2010 Winter Olympics, in women's parallel giant slalom.

References

External links 
 

1981 births
Living people
Sportspeople from Jyväskylä
Finnish female snowboarders
Olympic snowboarders of Finland
Snowboarders at the 2010 Winter Olympics
21st-century Finnish people